The 2011–12 Macedonian First League was the 20th season of the Macedonian First Football League, the highest football league of Macedonia. It began on 31 July 2011 and ended on 23 May 2012.

The league title was won by FK Vardar, winning its 6th official Macedonian First League title, and first since the 2002–03 season. The team went through the season without a single defeat until Round 32, on 20 May 2012, out of 33 games played. The defeat ended their chance of being undefeated, however, concluded with only 1 loss on a very dominating season.

Promotion and relegation 

1 Vardar was initially relegated, but was stayed after was merged with Miravci, which won play-off match against Skopje. Later, the two sides were separated and Miravci were refused a First League licence.

Participating teams

League table

Results 
Every team will play three times against each other team for a total of 33 matches. The first 22 matchdays will consist of a regular double round-robin schedule. The league standings at this point will then be used to determine the games for the last 11 matchdays.

Matches 1–22

Matches 23–33

Relegation playoff

Season statistics

Top scorers
Updated 21 May 2012

See also
2011–12 Macedonian Football Cup
2011–12 Macedonian Second Football League
2011–12 Macedonian Third Football League

References

External links
Football Federation of Macedonia 
MacedonianFootball.com 

Macedonia
1
Macedonian First Football League seasons